1691 Oort, provisional designation , is a rare-type carbonaceous Themistian asteroid from the outer region of the asteroid belt, approximately 33 kilometers in diameter.

It was discovered on 9 September 1956, by German astronomer Karl Reinmuth and Dutch astronomer Ingrid van Houten-Groeneveld at Heidelberg Observatory in south-west Germany. It was later named after Dutch astronomer Jan Oort.

Orbit and classification 

is a member of the Themis family, a dynamical family of outer-belt asteroids with nearly coplanar ecliptical orbits. Oort orbits the Sun at a distance of 2.6–3.7 AU once every 5 years and 7 months (2,054 days). Its orbit has an eccentricity of 0.18 and an inclination of 1° with respect to the ecliptic.

Information about an earlier 1917-identification, is not available.

Physical characteristics 

The dark C-type asteroid, classified as a rare intermediate CU-type in the Tholen taxonomy.

Rotation period 

In February 2009, a rotational lightcurve of Oort was obtained from photometric observations taken by French amateur astronomer René Roy. It gave a well-defined rotation period of 10.2705 hours with a brightness variation of 0.38 magnitude. An international study from 2013, published a concurring, modeled period of 10.2684 hours.

Diameter and albedo 

According to the surveys carried out by the Japanese Akari satellite and NASA's Wide-field Infrared Survey Explorer with its subsequent NEOWISE mission, Oort measures 33.64 and 37.37 kilometers in diameter, and its surface has an albedo of 0.065 and 0.053, respectively. The Collaborative Asteroid Lightcurve Link assumes an albedo of 0.10 and calculates a diameter of 27.13 kilometers with an absolute magnitude of 10.95.

Naming 

This minor planet was named in honor of Dutch astronomer Jan Oort (1900–1992), director of the Leiden Observatory (1945–1970), president of the International Astronomical Union (1958–1961), and a well-known authority on stellar statistics and galactic structure.

He overturned the idea that the Sun was at the center of the Milky Way. The Oort cloud, the outermost gravitationally bound region of the Solar System, was also named after him. The official  was published by the Minor Planet Center on 15 February 1970.

References

External links 
 Asteroid Lightcurve Database (LCDB), query form (info )
 Dictionary of Minor Planet Names, Google books
 Asteroids and comets rotation curves, CdR – Observatoire de Genève, Raoul Behrend
 Discovery Circumstances: Numbered Minor Planets (1)-(5000) – Minor Planet Center
 
 

001691
Discoveries by Karl Wilhelm Reinmuth
Discoveries by Ingrid van Houten-Groeneveld
Named minor planets
Jan Oort
001691
19560909